Kristín Eiríksdóttir (born 1981) is an Icelandic poet and author.

Eiríksdótter's debut novel, Kjötbærinn (Meat Town) was published in 2004. This was followed by Húðlit auðnin (Skin-coloured Wasteland) in 2006 and Annarskonar sæla (A Different Sort of Bliss) in 2008. Her first two books were a mixture of poetry and prose while her third was entirely poetry.

She was one of the winners of the Bókmenntaverðlaun starfsfólks bókaverslana with her 2014 book Kok (Cook).

Her novel, Elín, ýmislegt (A Fist or a Heart), won the Icelandic Literary Prize and was shortlisted for the 2019 Nordic Council Literature Prize.

Bibliography

 Kjötbærinn (Meat Town) (2004) 
 Húðlit auðnin (Skin-coloured Wasteland) (2006) 
 Annarskonar sæla (A Different Sort of Bliss) (2008) 
 Doris deyr (Doris Dies) (2010) 
 Hvítfeld: Fjölskyldusaga (2012) 
 Kok (Cook) (2014) 
 Elín, ýmislegt (A Fist or a Heart) (2017)

References

1981 births
Living people
Kristin Eiriksdottir
Kristin Eiriksdottir
Kristin Eiriksdottir
Kristin Eiriksdottir